Mohamed Rahmat Mia (born 8 December 1999) is a Bangladeshi footballer who currently plays as a defender for Bangladesh Premier League club Abahani Limited Dhaka and the Bangladesh national team. He is a versatile fullback who can play in both sides. He is also an important member of Bangladesh national under-23 football team.

Career statistics

Club

In the 2017-18 season, he started his senior club career by playing for Saif SC. He also made his continental debut by playing in the AFC Cup qualifying round on 2018.

Notes

International

On 27 March 2018, Rahmat made his international debut against Laos. He also  represented Bangladesh U-23 team in the 2018 Asian Games.

International goals

Youth

References

1999 births
Living people
Bangladeshi footballers
Bangladesh international footballers
Association football defenders
Saif SC players
Footballers at the 2018 Asian Games
Asian Games competitors for Bangladesh
People from Magura District
Abahani Limited (Dhaka) players
Bangladesh Football Premier League players